The 51st British Academy Film Awards, given by the British Academy of Film and Television Arts on 19 April 1998, honoured the best in film for 1997.

Peter Cattaneo's The Full Monty won the award for Best Film, while Nil by Mouth, from writer/director Gary Oldman, was voted Outstanding British Film.

The nominations were announced on 9 March 1998.

The ceremony was hosted by Rory Bremner.

Winners and nominees

Statistics

See also
 70th Academy Awards
 23rd César Awards
 3rd Critics' Choice Awards
 50th Directors Guild of America Awards
 11th European Film Awards
 55th Golden Globe Awards
 9th Golden Laurel Awards
 18th Golden Raspberry Awards
 2nd Golden Satellite Awards
 12th Goya Awards
 13th Independent Spirit Awards
 3rd Lumières Awards
 24th Saturn Awards
 4th Screen Actors Guild Awards
 50th Writers Guild of America Awards

References

External links
 Film in 1998 at BAFTA
 BAFTA Awards (1998) at IMDb

Film051
1997 film awards
1998 in British cinema
April 1998 events in the United Kingdom
1998 in London
1997 awards in the United Kingdom